Anthony James Hibbert (born 20 February 1981) is an English footballer, currently playing for French amateur side ES Louzy.

Originally a midfielder, Hibbert converted to play at right-back. He spent his entire professional career with Everton, having joined the club in 1991. He made his senior debut for Everton in 2001, and went on to make 328 appearances for the club in all competitions. With Hibbert being a one-club man for most of his career, coupled with his down-to-earth demeanour, he earned a cult hero status among Everton fans. He retired from playing in 2016 but returned to football in 2021 to play for amateur club ES Louzy in France.

Club career
Hibbert was born in Liverpool and brought up in Huyton. Growing up as an Everton supporter, Hibbert joined the club as a boy. He was a member of the Everton youth team that won the FA Youth Cup in 1998 beating Blackburn Rovers 5–3 on aggregate. Three years later, he made his first-team debut for the club in a Premier League match against West Ham United on 31 March 2001, in which a high challenge from Stuart Pearce into Hibbert's chest saw Everton earn a penalty.

In the 2002–03 season, in the wake of an injury to fellow right-back Steve Watson, Hibbert became a regular member of the Everton first team. The Actim Index rated him the best English right-back in the 2004–05 season.

He missed the end of the 2005–06 season with a hernia problem and his preparations for the 2006–07 season were hampered after he was infected by cryptosporidium parasite. Hibbert's 2006–07 season was seriously disrupted by injury. He again played regularly in the 2007–08 and the 2008–09 seasons.

At the start of the 2010–11 season, Hibbert was Everton's longest-serving player, the only player who had been at the club throughout the entire reign of former manager David Moyes, and had appeared in more competitive European games than any other Everton player. In addition, he had not scored in a competitive game during his professional career. Alongside his commitment to the club, the goal drought contributed to his cult hero status among Everton fans, to the extent that a banner reading "If Hibbert Scores, We Riot" was displayed at the 2009 FA Cup semi-final.

Hibbert was awarded a testimonial match for Everton following 10 years of service. The match was played on 8 August 2012 against Greek side AEK Athens, the team against whom Hibbert made his eighteenth appearance in all European competitions for Everton, equalling a club record. Hibbert scored Everton's fourth goal, a free kick, in a 4–1 win prompting a pitch invasion.

Hibbert's 2012–13 season was littered with injuries. In the early part of the season he suffered neck and calf injuries which kept him out of action until November. He only returned for a few games before a recurrence of the calf injury forced him to have surgery which meant he did not play again until he came on as a substitute in Everton's final home game of the season. The match was manager David Moyes' last home game in charge of the side following his decision to end his 11-year reign to join Manchester United. Hibbert's appearance meant that he was the only remaining player at the club who had featured in Moyes' first squad.

The form of Séamus Coleman who was later named the club's 2013–14 Player of the Season kept Hibbert out of the first team to such an extent that he only made one league appearance during the campaign. Despite his limited first-team opportunities, manager Roberto Martínez said he was ready to offer a new deal to Hibbert. In July 2014, he signed a two-year contract with the club.

Hibbert saw very little gametime come his way over the following two seasons. At the end of the 2015–16 season he was released by the club after 25 years, of which 18 were as a professional Everton player. He announced his retirement shortly afterwards.

After moving to France following the end of his professional playing career, Hibbert registered as a veteran player with amateur club ES Louzy in November 2021.

International career
Hibbert was called up to the England under-21 team in October 2002 for games against Slovakia and Macedonia but he did not play in either game due to a hamstring injury.

Career statistics
Source:

Personal life
Hibbert was the victim of a high-profile burglary in 2006. In 2013, he purchased a 33-acre French carp fishery on the outskirts of Reims called Lac de Premiere.

Honours
Everton Youth
 FA Youth Cup: 1997–98

Everton
 FA Cup runner-up: 2008–09

See also
 List of one-club men

References

External links

1981 births
Living people
People from Huyton
Footballers from Liverpool
Association football fullbacks
English footballers
Everton F.C. players
Premier League players
FA Cup Final players